Alayunt is a village in the Kütahya Province of Turkey. As of 2016, Alayunt has a population of 528, which is a slight increase from its 2015 population of 510.

Alayunt is most known for the railway junction situated just south of the village. Alayunt railway station is serviced by ten daily trains and also consists of a small yard for freight trains. Apart from the railway station, the Kütahya Industrial Park (Kütahya OSB) is located southeast of the village. Founded in 2004, the park has grown since and is currently the largest industrial park in the Kütahya Province.

The current mayor of Alayunt is Mehmet Erdoğmuş.

References

Populated places in Kütahya Province